John William Wofford (January 1, 1898 – February 27, 1955) was an American equestrian. He competed in two events at the 1932 Summer Olympics.

Biography
John William Wofford was born in High Point, North Carolina on January 1, 1898.

He graduated from the United States Military Academy at West Point on June 15, 1920, and was commissioned as a 2nd lieutenant of infanty. He retired from the Army in 1943 with the rank of colonel.

He died from cancer at the Mayo Clinic in Rochester, Minnesota on February 27, 1955.

References

1898 births
1955 deaths
American male equestrians
Olympic equestrians of the United States
Equestrians at the 1932 Summer Olympics
Sportspeople from High Point, North Carolina
United States Military Academy alumni
United States Army colonels